Gum Grove is a small unincorporated community in Warren County, in the U.S. state of Ohio.

History
The community was named for a grove of gum trees near the original town site. The community had a schoolhouse, the Gum Grove School, now defunct.

References

Unincorporated communities in Warren County, Ohio